The 1789 United States House of Representatives elections in Maryland were held from December 15, 1788, to January 10, 1789, to elect the six U.S. representatives from the state of Maryland, one from each of the state's six congressional districts. The elections coincided with the 1788–89 U.S. presidential election, as well as other elections to the House of Representatives, elections to the United States Senate and various state and local elections.

Maryland had a mixed district/at-large system similar to Georgia's. Under Maryland law, "candidates were elected at-large but had to be residents of a specific district with the statewide vote determining winners from each district."

District 1

General election

Results

District 2

General election

Results

District 3

General election

Results

District 4

General election

Results

District 5

General election

Results

District 6

General election

Results

See also 
 United States House of Representatives elections, 1788 and 1789
 List of United States representatives from Maryland

References 

1789
Maryland
United States House of Representatives